Stranded Under Endless Sky is the first extended play by American ambient band Hammock. A follow-up to the band's first studio album, Kenotic, Stranded Under Endless Sky was released on compact disc through the band's own label, Hammock Music, on July 26, 2005. A 140-gram 12" vinyl version was released earlier that month, on July 16, 2005, through Republic of Texas Recordings and Somewherecold Records; it was limited to 100 copies on clear vinyl and 900 copies on black vinyl.

Reception

Stranded Under Endless Sky was met with positive critical reception. James Mason of AllMusic noted that the album packs "enough emotion and provocative instrumental storytelling to fully engage and satisfy even the most jaded listener" and served as a great introduction and for fans, a perfect teaser for the next album.

Track listing

References

External links
Stranded Under Endless Sky available for streaming at the official Hammock website

2005 EPs
Hammock (band) albums
Hammock Music albums
Somewherecold Records albums